Cecilia Johnson is a Ghanaian female politician and the former Chair of Ghana's Council of State. She was once the General Secretary of 31 December Women's Movement and also the Minister of Local Government.

References 

Living people
Government ministers of Ghana
Women government ministers of Ghana
Members of the Council of State (Ghana)
Ghanaian women activists
Year of birth missing (living people)